is a Japanese writer, best known for his young adult mystery series Kotenbu, also known as the Classic Literature Club series.

Biography 

Honobu Yonezawa was born in 1978 in the Gifu Prefecture.

From as young as he could remember, Yonezawa wanted to be a writer. At 11 years old, he wrote a sequel to H. G. Wells's The War of the Worlds, and started writing original novels in the second year of junior high school. In his second year of Kanazawa University studying literature, he started publishing his works on his site Hanmuden (汎夢殿) (the website was temporarily shut down after his official debut and these works are currently unavailable). His early work were diverse in genre, but Yonezawa was struck when he read Kaoru Kitamura's Flying Horse (空飛ぶ馬) and Princess in Rokunomiya (六の宮の姫君) while in university, and decided to turn his attention to writing mysteries.

After graduating from university, Yonezawa convinced his parents to let him try and attain his dream of writing a novel for two years. He got a job as a bookstore clerk in Takayama while he continued writing on the side. In 2001, he officially debuted with the novel Hyōka, (氷菓) which received an honorable mention in the 5th Kadokawa Gakuen Novel Young Person Mystery and Horror Category Awards (角川学園小説大賞). His decision to submit was fueled by positive reception of Hyōka on his website Hanmuden, that he personally saw a future in the combination of light novels and mysteries, and because he was late for the deadline of another award. Hyōka became the first novel in a series dubbed the Classic Literature Club (古典部) series, to be distributed by the newly established Sneaker Mystery Club within the Kadokawa Sneaker Bunko imprint. Hyōka was soon followed with Gusha no Endorōru (愚者のエンドロール) in 2002.

However, when Yonezawa had completed the draft for the third and what he intended to be the final book in the Classic Literature Club series, the label was going on hiatus due to changing trends in the market, so he could not get it published. Despite this, he was approached by Tokyo Sogensha who inquired what he was working on, thanks partly to recommendations from writers Kiyoshi Kasai and Kazuki Sakuraba. When he explained the situation to the publisher, they asked to see the draft and after a few days they requested rights to publish it. After discussions between Kadokawa, Tokyo Sogensha and Yonezawa, they agreed to have the novel published, and after changing details such as the characters and the setting, Sayonara Yōsei (さよなら妖精) was published in 2004. It was featured in the magazine Kono Mystery ga Sugoi! (このミステリーがすごい!) in 2005, ranking 20th in the domestic category.

In the same year, he published Shunki Gentei Ichigo Taruto Jiken (春期限定いちごタルト事件), the first novel of the Shōshimin (小市民) series.

Around the same time, he moved from Gifu to Tōkyō.

In 2008, when Yonezawa published Hakanai Hitsuji tachi no Shukuen (儚い羊たちの祝宴), he states that he started not only paying attention to the riddles present within his works, but also how they appeal to a wider audience. So when he published Oreta Ryūkotsu (折れた竜骨) in 2010, which incorporated some fantasy elements to an otherwise classical mystery story, it won the 64th Mystery Writers of Japan Award for the following year.

In 2012, Kyoto Animation aired an anime adaptation of the Classic Literature Club series under the name of the first novel, Hyōka.

Since 2013, he has been on the selection committee for the Mysteries! Rookie of the Year Award (ミステリーズ!新人賞).

In 2014, his short story collection Mangan (満願) was selected as one of the best mysteries in the Mystery ga Yomitai!, (ミステリーが読みたい!) Shūkan Bunshun Mystery Best 10, (週刊文春ミステリーベスト10) and Kono Mystery ga Sugoi! It was ranked the top in domestic rankings and became the first book in history to receive three simultaneous rankings from different publications. It also won the 27th Yamamoto Shūgorō Prize and the 151st Naoki Prize.

In 2016, he was selected by literary magazine Granta in their Japanese edition as one of the Granta Best of Young Japanese Novelists.

Awards and nominations
 Hyōka (or Hyouka) [lit. Frozen Dessert] (Novel)
 2001 – The Encouragement Prize in the 5th Kadokawa School Novel Prize (Kadokawa Gakuen Shōsetsu Taishō), YA Mystery/Horror category
 "Kokoroatari no Aru Mono wa" [lit. "Anyone Who Knows"] (Short story)
 2007 – Nominee for Mystery Writers of Japan Award for Best Short Story
 Inshite Miru [lit. Try Indulging] (Novel)
 2008 – Nominee for Honkaku Mystery Award for Best Novel
 Tsuisō Godanshō [lit. Five morceaux of Reminiscence] (Novel)
 2010 – Nominee for Mystery Writers of Japan Award for Best Novel
 2010 – Nominee for Honkaku Mystery Award for Best Novel
 Oreta Ryūkotsu [lit. Broken Keel] (Novel)
 2011 – Mystery Writers of Japan Award for Best Novel
 2011 – The Best Japanese Mystery Fiction of the Year (2012 Honkaku Mystery Best 10)
 2011 – Nominee for Honkaku Mystery Award for Best Novel
 2011 – Nominee for Yamamoto Shūgorō Prize
 Mangan (Novel)
 2014 – Yamamoto Shūgorō Prize
 2014 – Nominee for Naoki Prize
 Kokurōjō (Novel)
 2021 – Yamada Fūtarō Prize
 2021 – Naoki Prize

Bibliography

Hyōka series (Classic Literature Club series)

Novels
 , 2001
 , 2002
 , 2005
 , 2010
Short story collection
 , 2007
 
 
 
 
 
 
 
 , 2016

Shōshimin series
 , 2004
 , 2006
 , 2009
 , 2020

Standalone mystery novels
 , 2004
 , 2005
 , 2006 (A Partial Translation of Bottleneck at Tufts Digital Library)
 , 2007
 , 2008
 , 2009
 , 2010
 , 2009
 , 2014
 , 2018
 , 2019
 , 2021

Film adaptations
 The Incite Mill (2010, directed by Hideo Nakata) (based on the novel Inshite Miru)

See also

Japanese detective fiction
Light novel

References

External links
 Twitter

1978 births
Living people
20th-century Japanese novelists
21st-century Japanese novelists
Japanese male short story writers
Japanese mystery writers
Light novelists
Mystery Writers of Japan Award winners
Naoki Prize winners
Writers of young adult literature
Writers from Gifu Prefecture
20th-century Japanese short story writers
21st-century Japanese short story writers
20th-century Japanese male writers
21st-century male writers